is a mountain in Asahikawa, Hokkaidō, Japan. It is part of the Ishikari Mountains.

Mount Asahi hosts Mount Asahi Park and Asahiyama Zoo.

Geology
Mount Asahi is formed from non-alkaline mafic rock from the middle to late Miocene. Non-alkaline rock from pyroclastic flows in the late Miocene to early Pliocene are also present. The flanks of the mountain include accretionary complex of Permian basalt block and a melange mix of late Jurassic to early Cretaceous.

References 

Asahi